Scarlet Knight may refer to:

Rutgers Scarlet Knights, the Rutgers University athletic teams
RU-27, an experimental robot submersible named after the teams
"Scarlet Knight" (song), the 23rd single by Japanese singer and voice actress Nana Mizuki